Siyanda Grey (born 16 August 1989) is a South African professional rugby union player who last played for the  in the Currie Cup and in the Rugby Challenge. His usual position is centre or wing.

Career

Youth

Eastern Province Kings

He was included in the ' 2010 Vodacom Cup squad, scoring on his debut against . He started three more Vodacom Cup that season, scoring another try. He returned to the Kings Vodacom Cup squad in 2011, scoring five tries in eight appearances.

However, Grey then suffered a serious cruciate ligament which saw him miss the remainder of 2011 and the majority of the 2012 season.

He was named in the  squad for their inaugural season in the Super Rugby competition in 2013.

Grey returned to domestic action in the 2013 Currie Cup First Division, getting one try in his three appearances, but then suffered another long-term injury, with torn knee ligaments ruling him out of action until June 2014.

Representative rugby

In 2010, he was called up to an Emerging Springboks sevens team that played in the Safaricom Sevens tournament in Kenya.

The following year, Grey was included in the South African Kings team for the 2011 IRB Nations Cup. He was the leading try-scorer in the tournament, scoring six tries in three appearances, including a hat-trick against Georgia. Grey was also named as Player of the Tournament for his try-scoring exploits.

Statistics

References

1989 births
Living people
People from Great Kei Local Municipality
Xhosa people
South African rugby union players
Eastern Province Elephants players
Southern Kings players
Rugby union centres
Rugby union wings
Rugby union players from the Eastern Cape